Resul Elvan (born ) is a Turkish male weightlifter, competing in the 105 kg category and representing Turkey at international competitions. He competed at world championships, including at the 2015 World Weightlifting Championships.

Major results

References

1989 births
Living people
Turkish male weightlifters
Place of birth missing (living people)
Competitors at the 2018 Mediterranean Games
Mediterranean Games silver medalists for Turkey
Mediterranean Games bronze medalists for Turkey
Mediterranean Games medalists in weightlifting
21st-century Turkish people